Scott-Vincent Borba (born June 23, 1973) is an American celebrity esthetician, model, singer, actor and founder of e.l.f. Cosmetics, BORBA Inc. and Scott-Vincent Borba Inc.  He has authored three books on skin care and beauty.

Early life and education 
Borba was born to Evelyn Ann Borba and Anthony Robert Borba Sr. in Visalia, California. The youngest of five siblings, he completed high school and junior college in Visalia. Borba suffered with cystic acne, rosacea and weight problems during his youth. During college, Borba worked as a Ford Model and participated in runway fashion shows, including Calvin Klein and Versace. He received his B.S. degree in Psychology from the University of Santa Clara.

Career 
Following graduation, he moved to Los Angeles, California and became a licensed esthetician. He launched Hard Candy Cosmetics and worked in marketing for Procter & Gamble/Wella/Sebastian, Shiseido/Joico, Murad, and Johnson & Johnson/Neutrogena, where he launched the Neutrogena Men's line.

In June 2004, Borba co-founded the budget skin care line e.l.f. (short for eyes, lips, face) Cosmetics with Joseph Shamah. He worked with scientists, dermatologists and nutritionists to develop a line of skin care products which combined topical and edible ingredients. He began to market these later that year, including BORBA Waters beverages, supplements, and topical treatments. These were distributed in about 300 department stores, including Nordstrom's Cosmetics Department. Sephora, and Fred Segal.  by 2006 the products were also sold in about 1000 health food stores, Walgreens drug stores,  and through the QVC/Home Shopping Network.

In 2007, Borba published a book, Makeup for Dummies. That year Anheuser-Busch signed a deal with BORBA for marketing and distribution of BORBA Skin Balance Waters and the powdered form of the line, Aqua-Less Crystallines.

Borba published his second book, Skintervention: The Personalized Solution for Healthier, Younger, and Flawless-Looking Skin, in January 2011. By this time he had become a celebrity esthetician, helping models improve the appearance of their skin for public appearances. His most widely publicized work was a $7000 HD Diamond and Ruby facial he gave Mila Kunis for the 2011 Golden Globes.

In 2012, he founded Scott-Vincent Borba, Inc., and in 2013 he published a third book, Cooking Your Way to Gorgeous: Skin-Friendly Superfoods, Age-Reversing Recipes, and Fabulous Homemade Facials,  in which he discussed the skin benefits of various ingredients and recipes.

TPG Cosmetics purchased a majority stake in e.l.f. in February 2014.

Charity involvement 
Borba is spokesperson for the nonprofit organization Covenant House California. He also works with QLu, which raises funds for charities though auctions of personal items donated by celebrities. Since the death of his father, he is a representative for the Pancreatic Cancer Action Network.

References 

1973 births
Living people
Santa Clara University alumni
Male models from California
American company founders